"If It Gets You Where You Wanna Go" is a song recorded by Canadian country rock artist Dallas Smith. It was released in March 2012 as the second single from his debut solo album, Jumped Right In. It peaked at number 74 on the Canadian Hot 100 in June 2012.

"If It Gets You Where You Wanna Go" was previously recorded by Steve Holy on his 2011 album Love Don't Run.

Critical reception
Jeff DeDekker of the Leader-Post called the song "a perfect anthem for summer." He wrote that "fuelled by a fierce banjo, the song is fast and fun with a simple message — follow your heart."

Music video
The music video was directed by Stephano Barberis and premiered in April 2012.

Chart performance
"If It Gets You Where You Wanna Go" debuted at number 90 on the Canadian Hot 100 for the week of May 26, 2012.

Certifications

References

2011 songs
2012 singles
Dallas Smith songs
604 Records singles
Songs written by Rodney Atkins
Songs written by Rodney Clawson
Songs written by Jim Collins (singer)
Music videos directed by Stephano Barberis
Steve Holy songs
Song recordings produced by Joey Moi